Bodka Creek is a stream in the U.S. states of Alabama and Mississippi.

Bodka Creek is a name derived from the Choctaw language meaning "wide creeks", a reference to its many branches. Variant names are "Bodca Creek", "Bodea Creek", and "Bodkars Creek".

References

Rivers of Alabama
Rivers of Sumter County, Alabama
Rivers of Mississippi
Rivers of Kemper County, Mississippi
Alabama placenames of Native American origin
Mississippi placenames of Native American origin